The John Fairey Garden, formerly known as the Peckerwood Garden, is a forty-acre Garden Conservancy and ArbNet certified garden located in Hempstead, Texas in the United States, founded by John G. Fairey. Four thousand plants, many collected during the more than 125 expeditions to Mexico, many acquired through exchanges with botanical gardens and nurseries, exist in diverse naturalistic settings which is one of the hallmarks of John Fairey's landscape designs. Other design hallmarks include sculptural rock and path, wall and fountain, and art.

Location
The garden is located in Hempstead, Texas between Austin and Houston three miles south of Hwy 290 at 20559 FM  359 Rd. It is located at the confluence of three Texas geographic zones: the Gulf coast prairie region to the south, the pine and flatland woods to the east, and the Blackland prairie and post oak clay pan to the west and north.

References

External links
Official The John Fairey Garden website
Official The John Fairey Garden nursery availability list

Gardens in Texas
Arboreta in Texas
Protected areas of Waller County, Texas
Landscape architecture
+
Flora of Northeastern Mexico
Flora of Northwestern Mexico
Flora of Texas
Deserts of the United States